Folketing elections were held in Denmark on 2 December 1926, except in the Faroe Islands where they were held on 20 December. The Social Democratic Party remained the largest in the Folketing, with 53 of the 149 seats. Voter turnout was 77.0% in Denmark proper and 40.2% in the Faroes.

Results

References

Elections in Denmark
Denmark
Folketing
Denmark